This is a list of the governors of the province of Baghlan, Afghanistan.

Governors of Baghlan Province

See also
 List of current governors of Afghanistan

Notes

Baghlan